The Egyptian literary magazine al-Fajr (Arabic: الفجر; DMG: al-Faǧr; English: The Dawn) was published twice monthly in Cairo between 1934 and 1935. Two volumes with a total of 18 issues were edited.

References

1934 establishments in Egypt
1935 disestablishments in Africa
Arabic-language magazines
Defunct literary magazines
Defunct magazines published in Egypt
Literary magazines published in Egypt
Magazines established in 1934
Magazines established in 1935
Magazines published in Cairo